The Auatí-Paraná Extractive Reserve is an extractive reserve is Amazonas, Brazil.

Location

The Auatí-Paraná Extractive Reserve is divided between the municipalities of Japurá (54.69%) and Fonte Boa (45.31%) in Amazonas.
The reserve covers land along the north (left) bank of the Auati-Paraná Canal, which leaves the Solimões (Upper Amazon) to the south and meanders in a generally eastward direction to join the Japurá River to the north.
The reserve adjoins the Mamirauá Sustainable Development Reserve to the south.

Environment

The terrain is mostly flat in the south of the reserve, gently undulating further north.
There has been little study of the vegetation of the central and northern areas of the reserve.
Near the river the vegetation is dense tropical rainforest including terra firms forest with rubber, Brazil nut and buriti palm trees, várzea and igapó forest.
Threatened species of fauna include manatee, uacari, jaguar, ocelot and curassow.

History

The Auatí-Paraná Extractive Reserve was created by federal decree on 7 August 2001 to ensure the sustainable use and conservation of renewable natural resources, and to protect the way of life and culture of the extractive population.
It is classed as IUCN protected area category VI (protected area with sustainable use of natural resources).
It became part of the Central Amazon Ecological Corridor, established in 2002.
The reserve is managed by the Chico Mendes Institute for Biodiversity Conservation.
The deliberative council was created on 20 November 2008.
The management plan for the reserve was approved in 30 October 2012.

People

The original inhabitants of the region were the Omágua people, a Tupi-Guarani group.
They were known for their fine ceramics and finely woven clothes.
They were a warlike tribe, and took slaves from the people they defeated.
Claims of the Indians who traditionally lived on the reserve have not been addressed.

The present population are engaged in agriculture, hunting, fishing, fishing and crafts.
Agricultural work is shared between the men and women, while hunting and fishing are considered men's occupations and women work at home.
As of 2007, 80% of the population was Catholic and 20% Protestant. 80% were illiterate.
The community associação agroextrativista de auati-paraná is implementing a program of best practices in Brazil nut collection.
Some of the residents appear to have engaged in illegal logging for sale.

Notes

Sources

Extractive reserves of Brazil
Protected areas of Amazonas (Brazilian state)
2001 establishments in Brazil